Dinosaur Gardens is a tourist attraction in Ossineke, Michigan, United States. Built on a  tract of drained swampland, visitors encounter several dozen home-made sculptures of dinosaurs, prehistoric birds, prehistoric mammals, and cavemen. The attraction was started by folk artist Paul N. Domke in 1935. There is also a gift shop and a dinosaur-themed miniature golf course on the premises.

Dinosaur Gardens is perhaps best known for its seemingly out-of-place Christian imagery. For example, visitors are greeted at the entrance by a statue of Jesus holding a globe in his left hand. The belly of a Brontosaurus sculpture on the property includes a display proclaiming Jesus as “The Greatest Heart”.

See also 
 List of dinosaur parks

References

External links 
Official Dinosaur Gardens website
Roadside America: Profile of Dinosaur Gardens

Roadside attractions in Michigan
Dinosaur sculptures
Tourist attractions in Alpena County, Michigan
1930s establishments in Michigan
Buildings and structures in Alpena County, Michigan